, often Romanized as Tyôzaburô Tanaka (November 3, 1885 in Osaka – June 28, 1976), was a Japanese botanist and mycologist. He established one of the two major taxonomic classification systems for citrus and related genera currently in use, and is now considered to be a taxonomic "splitter". He is the author of 180 botanical names in the citrus family Rutaceae, including for example Citrus × latifolia (Persian lime) and Citrus tangerina (tangerine). Many of the species Tanaka described are still recognized, but his overall scheme is not supported by modern genetic research.

Works

See also
 Citrus hybrids

References

Botanists with author abbreviations
1885 births
1976 deaths
20th-century Japanese botanists
Japanese mycologists
People from Osaka